Levola S. Taylor is an American politician. She is a former member of the South Carolina House of Representatives from the 70th District, serving from 1991-1992. Taylor is a member of the Democratic party.

She was preceded by James Faber, and succeeded by Joseph Neal. When Neal died in February 2017, Taylor was among a number of Democrats to file for the seat in a special election. Wendy Brawley went on to win the Democratic nomination and the special election.

Taylor was among a number of African American women from around the United States who endorsed Hillary Rodham Clinton for President in 2016.

References 

Year of birth missing (living people)
Living people
Democratic Party members of the South Carolina House of Representatives